Sovereign Grace Fellowship of Canada (SGF) is a fellowship for Reformed Baptist churches in Canada holding to either the Baptist Confession of 1644 or 1689.

History
The Fellowship was founded in 1983 by William Payne, pastor of Trinity Baptist Church in Burlington, Ontario. 

In 2001, the Fellowship adopted a constitution. As of 2012, there were 14 churches, including the Jarvis Street Baptist Church in Toronto.

SGF publishes a magazine called Barnabas. It is one of the Baptist groups associated with the Toronto Baptist Seminary and Bible College.

See also
 Baptists in Canada
 Sovereign Grace Baptists

References

External links

Reformed Baptists denominations in North America
Baptist Christianity in Canada